Adel Ahmed Malalla (born 15 September 1961) is a Qatari footballer. He competed in the men's tournament at the 1984 Summer Olympics.

References

External links
 

1961 births
Living people
Qatari footballers
Qatar international footballers
Qatar Stars League players
Al Ahli SC (Doha) players
Olympic footballers of Qatar
Footballers at the 1984 Summer Olympics
1988 AFC Asian Cup players
1992 AFC Asian Cup players
Place of birth missing (living people)
Association football defenders